Richard Thomas Clementi (born March 31, 1977) is a former American mixed martial artist. Clementi has fought for the Ultimate Fighting Championships, Bellator, K-1 Hero's DREAM, King of the Cage, and Titan FC.

Background
Clementi was born in Edison, New Jersey but moved frequently during his childhood along with his mother, as a result of her divorcing Clementi's stepfather. His passion from an early age was in wrestling but most of the schools that he attended did not have programs for the sport. Clementi enjoyed watching the UFC, which was in its early stages while he was growing up. He moved out of the house at age 15 and eventually settled back in New Jersey for his senior year of high school where he began wrestling again, going 15–2 in his senior year, but admits that he "wasn't very technical." Though he was a standout prep wrestler, Clementi joined the military out of high school and served in the United States Navy's Construction Battalion. He served in the military for eight years.

Mixed martial arts career

Ultimate Fighting Championship
Clementi began his professional career in 1999 and amassed a 13–6 record before making his Ultimate Fighting Championship (UFC) debut at UFC 41, where he lost by submission to Yves Edwards. Clementi continued to fight in smaller promotions before appearing as a contestant on The Ultimate Fighter 4 reality show, which focused on promising fighters that had not succeeded in their UFC careers. Though the namesake of "Team No Love", Clementi lost his preliminary bout against Shonie Carter by unanimous decision. He appeared on the undercard of the season finale as a lightweight, but lost by rear naked choke submission to Din Thomas.

Despite his losses, Clementi continued to appear in the UFC. He secured his first victory in the promotion via rear naked choke submission against Ross Pointon at UFC Fight Night 8, although the fight was not aired during the broadcast. After losing to Roan Carneiro at UFC Fight Night 9, Clementi alternated between appearing in the UFC and smaller promotions.  He took a fight with Anthony Johnson at UFC 76 on two weeks' notice and won by rear naked choke submission. With the win, Clementi improved his official UFC record to 2–3.

Clementi followed up with a win at UFC 79 against Melvin Guillard. Guillard tapped from a rear naked choke. Prior to the match, Clementi and Guillard engaged in a war of words.

In the span of a month, Clementi racked up two more victories against Sam Stout and Terry Etim at UFC 83 and UFC 84 respectively. By this time, Clementi was riding a four-win streak in the UFC and a six-win streak in his career. The streak ended at UFC 90, where he lost to Gray Maynard by unanimous decision. Clementi followed up with an appearance at UFC Fight Night: Lauzon vs. Stephens, where he lost to Gleison Tibau by guillotine choke. With his second consecutive loss in the UFC, Clementi was cut from the promotion's roster.

Independent Promotions
On June 27, 2009, Clementi was in the main event for the first ever MMA fight in Pennsylvania. The promotion company UCFC held its "Rumble on the Rivers" event in Pittsburgh's Mellon Arena. Clementi was unable to continue the fight after only 40 seconds into the first round because of a broken collar bone after a takedown and the ringside doctor stopped the fight.

On November 29, 2009, Clementi headlined the event "Cage Wars: Nightmare" in Belfast, Northern Ireland and fought local prospect Chris Stringer, defeating him by triangle choke in the second round, after dominating the fight. Clementi followed that win by headlining the Team 3:16 – Season's Beatings Event in Shreveport, Louisiana, defeating Derrick Krantz in the first round via armbar.

On January 16 at the 5150 Fight League's "The New Year's Revolution" show Clementi defeated WEC veteran Mike Budnik via rear naked choke to win the 5150 Combat League Lightweight Championship and improving his record upon being cut from the UFC to 4–1.

Bellator Fighting Championships
Clementi was signed by Bellator and made his debut at Bellator 28 against Carey Vanier in a Bellator Lightweight tournament Qualifying bout, He lost by split decision.

On May 25, 2012, Clementi returned to Bellator at Bellator 70, he defeated Derek Campos by guillotine choke in round one.

Clementi faced  Alexander Sarnavskiy on October 19, 2012 at Bellator 77 in a Lightweight Tournament Quarter Final bout. He won the fight by split decision.

Clementi faced Marcin Held in the Semifinals on November 16, 2012 at Bellator 81 and lost via toe hold submission in the second round.

On November 19, 2012 Clementi announced his retirement after competing in MMA for 13 years.

On July 24, 2013, Clementi announced he has come out of retirement and returned to Bellator to complete in the promotions Season Nine Lightweight Tournament, He was set to face UK Fighter Rob Sinclair on September 27, 2013 at Bellator 101 in the Quarterfinals. But on September 10, 2013, it was announced that Sinclair had to pull out of the fight due to a knee injury and was replaced by Ricardo Tirloni. He lost via unanimous decision.

Personal life
Clementi spent eight years in the military with the Navy Seabees and was mobilized as a reservist after 9/11. He also runs "Rich Clementi's Gladiator Gym" in his hometown of Slidell, Louisiana.
Clementi is divorced from his first wife and has two sons and a daughter with his second wife, Mandi.

Championships and accomplishments
5150 Combat League / Xtreme Fighting League
5150 Combat League Lightweight Championship (One time)

Mixed martial arts record

|-
| Loss
| align=center| 45–23–1
| Ricardo Tirloni
| Decision (unanimous)
| Bellator 101
| 
| align=center| 3
| align=center| 5:00
| Portland, Oregon, United States
| 
|-
| Loss
| align=center| 45–22–1
| Marcin Held
| Submission (toe hold)
| Bellator 81
| 
| align=center| 2
| align=center| 3:04
| Kingston, Rhode Island, United States
| 
|-
| Win
| align=center| 45–21–1
| Alexander Sarnavskiy
| Decision (split)
| Bellator 77
| 
| align=center| 3
| align=center| 5:00
| Reading, Pennsylvania, United States
| 
|-
| Win
| align=center| 44–21–1
| Robert Washington
| Submission (guillotine choke)
| Rogue Warrior Championships
| 
| align=center| 3
| align=center| 3:51
| Las Vegas, Nevada, United States
| 
|-
| Win
| align=center| 43–21–1
| Derek Campos
| Submission (guillotine choke)
| Bellator 70
| 
| align=center| 1
| align=center| 4:18
| New Orleans, Louisiana, United States
| 
|-
| Loss
| align=center| 42–21–1
| Chris Clements
| TKO (punches)
| Score Fighting Series 3: Meltdown in the Valley
| 
| align=center| 3
| align=center| 3:17
| Sarnia, Ontario, Canada
| 
|-
| Win
| align=center| 42–20–1
| Ronnie Rogers
| Submission (rear-naked choke)
| Victory Promotions: Clementi vs. Rogers
| 
| align=center| 2
| align=center| 1:05
| Lowell, Massachusetts, United States
| 
|- 
| Loss
| align=center| 41–20–1
| Shinya Aoki
| Submission (neck crank)
| Dream: Fight for Japan!
| 
| align=center| 2
| align=center| 2:32
| Saitama, Saitama, Japan
| 
|-
| Loss
| align=center| 41–19–1
| Reza Madadi
| Decision (unanimous)
| Superior Challenge 7
| 
| align=center| 3
| align=center| 5:00
| Stockholm, Sweden
| 
|-
| Win
| align=center| 41–18–1
| Josh Hinkle
| Decision (unanimous)
| TCF: Rogue Warrior Championships
| 
| align=center| 3
| align=center| 5:00
| El Paso, Texas, United States
| 
|-
| Loss
| align=center| 40–18–1
| Aaron Derrow
| Technical Submission (triangle choke)
| Titan FC 16: Sylvia vs. Wagner
| 
| align=center| 3
| align=center| 3:35
| Kansas City, Kansas, United States
| 
|-
| Win
| align=center| 40–17–1
| Felipe Enomoto
| Submission (armbar)
| Cage Wars 13: Validation
| 
| align=center| 3
| align=center| 4:25
| Belfast, Northern Ireland
| 
|-
| Loss
| align=center| 39–17–1
| Carey Vanier
| Decision (split)
| Bellator 28
| 
| align=center| 3
| align=center| 5:00
| New Orleans, Louisiana, United States
| 
|-
| Win
| align=center| 39–16–1
| Lenny Nelson
| Submission (rear-naked choke)
| SFC: Hostile Validation
| 
| align=center| 1
| align=center| 3:32
| Milwaukee, Wisconsin, United States
| 
|-
| Win
| align=center| 38–16–1
| Glen Cordoza
| Submission (armbar)
| CFC: Full Force
| 
| align=center| 2
| align=center| 2:21
| Lafayette, Louisiana, United States
| 
|-
| Loss
| align=center| 37–16–1
| Quinn Mulhern
| TKO (punches)
| KOTC: Vengeance
| 
| align=center| 2
| align=center| 3:09
| Mescalero, New Mexico, United States
| 
|-
| Win
| align=center| 37–15–1
| Mike Budnik
| Submission (rear-naked choke)
| Xtreme Fighting League: New Year's Revolution
| 
| align=center| 5
| align=center| 2:10
| Tulsa, Oklahoma, United States
| 
|-
| Win
| align=center| 36–15–1
| Derrick Krantz
| Submission (armbar)
| Team 3:16 MMA: Season's Beatings
| 
| align=center| 1
| align=center| 4:54
| Shreveport, Louisiana, United States
| 
|-
| Win
| align=center| 35–15–1
| Chris Stringer
| Submission (triangle choke)
| CWC: Nightmare
| 
| align=center| 2
| align=center| 3:11
| Belfast, Northern Ireland
| 
|-
| Loss
| align=center| 34–15–1
| Kyle Jensen
| TKO (injury)
| UCFC Rumble on the Rivers
| 
| align=center| 1
| align=center| 0:40
| Pittsburgh, Pennsylvania, United States
| 
|-
| Win
| align=center| 34–14–1
| Omar Zapata
| Submission (arm-triangle choke)
| Adrenaline MMA 3: Bragging Rights
| 
| align=center| 1
| align=center| 4:16
| Birmingham, Alabama, United States
| 
|-
| Loss
| align=center| 33–14–1
| Gleison Tibau
| Submission (guillotine choke)
| UFC Fight Night: Lauzon vs. Stephens
| 
| align=center| 1
| align=center| 4:35
| Tampa, Florida, United States
| 
|-
| Loss
| align=center| 33–13–1
| Gray Maynard
| Decision (unanimous)
| UFC 90
| 
| align=center| 3
| align=center| 5:00
| Rosemont, Illinois, United States
| 
|-
| Win
| align=center| 33–12–1
| Terry Etim
| Decision (unanimous)
| UFC 84
| 
| align=center| 3
| align=center| 5:00
| Las Vegas, Nevada, United States
| 
|-
| Win
| align=center| 32–12–1
| Sam Stout
| Decision (split)
| UFC 83
| 
| align=center| 3
| align=center| 5:00
| Montreal, Quebec, Canada
| 
|-
| Win
| align=center| 31–12–1
| Melvin Guillard
| Submission (rear-naked choke)
| UFC 79
| 
| align=center| 1
| align=center| 4:40
| Las Vegas, Nevada, United States
| 
|-
| Win
| align=center| 30–12–1
| Antoine Skinner
| TKO (submission to punches)
| NLE: Punishment at the PMAC
| 
| align=center| 1
| align=center| 1:46
| Baton Rouge, Louisiana, United States
| 
|-
| Win
| align=center| 29–12–1
| Anthony Johnson
| Submission (rear-naked choke)
| UFC 76
| 
| align=center| 2
| align=center| 3:05
| Anaheim, California, United States
| 
|-
| Win
| align=center| 28–12–1
| Kyle Gibbons
| Submission (rear-naked choke)
| IFO: Wiuff vs. Salmon
| 
| align=center| 1
| align=center| 2:18
| Las Vegas, Nevada, United States
| 
|-
| Loss
| align=center| 27–12–1
| Roan Carneiro
| Decision (unanimous)
| UFC Fight Night: Stevenson vs. Guillard
| 
| align=center| 3
| align=center| 5:00
| Las Vegas, Nevada, United States
| 
|-
| Win
| align=center| 27–11–1
| Ross Pointon
| Submission (rear-naked choke)
| UFC Fight Night 8
| 
| align=center| 2
| align=center| 4:53
| Hollywood, Florida, United States
| 
|-
| Loss
| align=center| 26–11–1
| Din Thomas
| Submission (rear-naked choke)
| The Ultimate Fighter: The Comeback Finale
| 
| align=center| 2
| align=center| 3:11
| Las Vegas, Nevada, United States
| 
|-
| Loss
| align=center| 26–10–1
| Caol Uno
| Decision (unanimous)
| Hero's 4
| 
| align=center| 2
| align=center| 5:00
| Tokyo, Japan
| 
|-
| Win
| align=center| 26–9–1
| Brian Dunn
| TKO (punches)
| Battle at the Boardwalk
| 
| align=center| 1
| align=center| 4:48
| Atlantic City, New Jersey, United States
| 
|-
| Win
| align=center| 25–9–1
| Fabio Holanda
| TKO (punches)
| TKO 24: Eruption
| 
| align=center| 3
| align=center| 4:20
| Montreal, Quebec, Canada
| 
|-
| Win
| align=center| 24–9–1
| Ryan Schultz
| Submission (armbar)
| Absolute Fighting Championships 14
| 
| align=center| 1
| align=center| 3:39
| Fort Lauderdale, Florida, United States
| 
|-
| Win
| align=center| 23–9–1
| Chris Mickle
| TKO (punches)
| Extreme Challenge 64
| 
| align=center| 1
| align=center| 2:51
| Osceola, Iowa, United States
| 
|-
| Win
| align=center| 22–9–1
| Daisuke Hanazawa
| Decision (unanimous)
| Euphoria: USA vs World
| 
| align=center| 3
| align=center| 5:00
| Atlantic City, New Jersey, United States
| 
|-
| Win
| align=center| 21–9–1
| Henry Matamoros
| Decision (unanimous)
| Euphoria: Road to the Titles
| 
| align=center| 3
| align=center| 5:00
| Atlantic City, New Jersey, United States
| 
|-
| Win
| align=center| 20–9–1
| Tom Kirk
| Submission (rear-naked choke)
| RCF: Showdown
| 
| align=center| 1
| align=center| N/A
| Biloxi, Mississippi, United States
| 
|-
| Win
| align=center| 19–9–1
| Eddie Yagin
| TKO (doctor stoppage)
| PXC 2: Chaos
| 
| align=center| 3
| align=center| N/A
| Mangilao, Guam
| 
|-
| Win
| align=center| 18–9–1
| Sergey Golyaev
| Submission (triangle choke)
| Euphoria: Russia vs USA
| 
| align=center| 2
| align=center| 3:43
| Atlantic City, New Jersey, United States
| 
|-
| Loss
| align=center| 17–9–1
| David Gardner
| Decision (unanimous)
| Freestyle Fighting Championships 8
| 
| align=center| 3
| align=center| 5:00
| Biloxi, Mississippi, United States
| 
|-
| Loss
| align=center| 17–8–1
| Marcus Aurélio
| TKO (eye injury)
| ZST: Grand Prix Final Round
| 
| align=center| 1
| align=center| 0:40
| Tokyo, Japan
| 
|-
| Win
| align=center| 17–7–1
| Tomomi Iwama
| Decision (unanimous)
| ZST: Grand Prix Final Round
| 
| align=center| 2
| align=center| 5:00
| Tokyo, Japan
| 
|-
| Win
| align=center| 16–7–1
| Naoyuki Kotani
| Decision (unanimous)
| ZST: Grand Prix Final Round
| 
| align=center| 2
| align=center| 5:00
| Tokyo, Japan
| 
|-
| Win
| align=center| 15–7–1
| Aloisio Barros
| Decision (unanimous)
| ZST: Grand Prix Opening Round
| 
| align=center| 2
| align=center| 5:00
| Tokyo, Japan
| 
|-
| Draw
| align=center| 14–7–1
| Hiroki Kotani
| Draw
| ZST 4: The Battle Field 4
| 
| align=center| 3
| align=center| 5:00
| Tokyo, Japan
| 
|-
| Win
| align=center| 14–7
| Jon Weidler
| KO (knee)
| FFC 6: No Love
| 
| align=center| 1
| align=center| 0:35
| Biloxi, Mississippi, United States
| 
|-
| Loss
| align=center| 13–7
| Yves Edwards
| Submission (rear naked choke)
| UFC 41
| 
| align=center| 3
| align=center| 4:07
| Atlantic City, New Jersey, United States
| 
|-
| Win
| align=center| 13–6
| James Meals
| TKO (punches)
| Tuesday Night Fights
| 
| align=center| 1
| align=center| 1:55
| Davenport, Iowa, United States
| 
|-
| Win
| align=center| 12–6
| Isaias Martinez
| TKO (broken nose)
| RFC 1: The Beginning
| 
| align=center| 1
| align=center| 5:00
| Las Vegas, Nevada, United States
| 
|-
| Win
| align=center| 11–6
| Joe Jordan
| Submission (armbar)
| Freestyle Fighting Championships 2
| 
| align=center| 1
| align=center| 2:05
| Biloxi, Mississippi, United States
| 
|-
| Win
| align=center| 10–6
| Justin James
| Submission (rear-naked choke)
| Rock 'N' Rumble 1
| 
| align=center| 2
| align=center| 1:20
| United States
| 
|-
| Win
| align=center| 9–6
| Cedric Stewart
| Submission (rear naked choke)
| Extreme Challenge 44
| 
| align=center| 1
| align=center| 2:23
| Lake Charles, Louisiana, United States
| 
|-
| Win
| align=center| 8–6
| Warren Donley
| KO (punches)
| RCF 11
| 
| align=center| 2
| align=center| 0:30
| United States
| 
|-
| Win
| align=center| 7–6
| Danny Payne
| Submission (neck crank)
| RCF 10
| 
| align=center| 1
| align=center| 1:37
| Houma, Louisiana, United States
| Drops to Lightweight
|-
| Win
| align=center| 6–6
| Edwin Allseitz
| Submission (kimura)
| DFC: Submission Grappling Championships
| 
| align=center| 1
| align=center| 3:36
| Houston, Texas, United States
| 
|-
| Win
| align=center| 5–6
| Jeremy Jiminez
| Submission (armbar)
| DFC: Submission Grappling Championships
| 
| align=center| 1
| align=center| 2:15
| Houston, Texas, United States
| 
|-
| Loss
| align=center| 4–6
| Pete Spratt
| TKO (doctor stoppage)
| RCF 9
| 
| align=center| 1
| align=center| N/A
| Houma, Louisiana, United States
| 
|-
| Win
| align=center| 4–5
| Charles Bennett
| TKO (submission to punches)
| WEF: Rumble at the Rodeo 1
| 
| align=center| 1
| align=center| N/A
| United States
| 
|-
| Loss
| align=center| 3–5
| Steve Berger
| Submission (armbar)
| Dangerzone: Insane In Ft. Wayne
| 
| align=center| 1
| align=center| 3:14
| Fort Wayne, Indiana, United States
| 
|-
| Loss
| align=center| 3–4
| Rick McCoy
| Decision
| Dangerzone: Night of the Beast
| 
| align=center| 2
| align=center| 15:00
| Lynchburg, Virginia, United States
| 
|-
| Loss
| align=center| 3–3
| Ben Earwood
| Submission (armbar)
| EC 36: Extreme Challenge 36
| 
| align=center| 1
| align=center| 8:32
| Davenport, Iowa, United States
| 
|-
| Win
| align=center| 3–2
| Dymitrius Wilson
| TKO (punches)
| WVF: Cage Brawl
| 
| align=center| 1
| align=center| 4:40
| Chalmette, Louisiana, United States
| 
|-
| Win
| align=center| 2–2
| Aristides Britto
| TKO (submission to punches)
| RCF 6: Reality Combat Fighting 6
| 
| align=center| 1
| align=center| 2:19
| Thibodaux, Louisiana, United States
| 
|-
| Win
| align=center| 1–2
| Scott Melia
| TKO (submission to punches)
| RCF 6: Reality Combat Fighting 6
| 
| align=center| 1
| align=center| 1:28
| Thibodaux, Louisiana, United States
| 
|-
| Loss
| align=center| 0–2
| Rick Thompson
| Decision
| RCF 3: Return of the Rage
| 
| align=center| 1
| align=center| 18:00
| Metairie, Louisiana, United States
| 
|-
| Loss
| align=center| 0–1
| Chris Seifert
| Decision (unanimous)
| WEF 7: Stomp in the Swamp
| 
| align=center| 3
| align=center| 2:00
| Kenner, Louisiana, United States
|

Professional boxing record

{|class="wikitable" style="text-align:center; font-size:95%"
|-
!
!Result
!Record
!Opponent
!Method
!Round, time
!Date
!Location
!Notes
|-
|1
|Loss
|0–1
|style="text-align:left;"| Martin Verdin
|MD
|4
|May 27, 2004
|style="text-align:left;"| 
|style="text-align:left;"|

Filmography
 2012 — Dragon Eyes
 2012- Philly Kid-Sanchez

See also
 List of Bellator MMA alumni
 List of mixed martial artists with professional boxing records
 List of male mixed martial artists

References

External links

BoxRec: Rich Clementi
UFC profile
Interview by CriticalBench.com
Detailed results from Cage Wars Championship "Nightmare"

1977 births
Living people
American male mixed martial artists
Mixed martial artists from New Jersey
Mixed martial artists from Louisiana
Lightweight mixed martial artists
Welterweight mixed martial artists
Mixed martial artists utilizing boxing
Mixed martial artists utilizing wrestling
Mixed martial artists utilizing Brazilian jiu-jitsu
People from Edison, New Jersey
Sportspeople from Middlesex County, New Jersey
American people of Italian descent
American male boxers
Boxers from New Jersey
Boxers from Louisiana
American practitioners of Brazilian jiu-jitsu
People from Slidell, Louisiana
Ultimate Fighting Championship male fighters